Gepinto is the first studio album of the Chilean musician Daniel Riveros, better known as Gepe, released in 2005 under the independent label Quemasucabeza after his EP 5x5. This album includes his first success, entitled "Namás" With the participation of the singer Dadalú. In April 2008, the Chilean edition of Rolling Stone magazine placed him in the 22nd place in the 50 best Chilean records of all time.

Track listing

Personnel 
 Interpreters
 Gepe: Voice, guitar, keyboards, percussion, metallophone.
 Pablo Flores: Accordion, percussion, charango, kaoss Pad, bass.
 Sebastián Sampieri: Charango, percussion, rhythmic.

 Others
 Gepe: Artwork
 Jean Despujol: Artwork
 Pablo González: Mastering
 Rodrigo Santis: Mixes, production, recording

Accolades

References 

2005 debut albums
Gepe albums